Long Point Key is an island in the middle Florida Keys.

U.S. 1 (or the Overseas Highway) traverses the key between Crawl Key and Fat Deer Key, which is part of a long stretch of road known as the Grassy Key Causeway.

It is entirely within the city of Marathon, Florida.

References

Islands of the Florida Keys
Islands of Monroe County, Florida
Islands of Florida